King George Sound is a body of water within Norfolk Bay, in Tasmania, Australia. It opens into Norfolk Bay at King George Island and extends to the town of Murdunna.

The southern part of the mouth of King George Sound lies Flinder's trench, which used to be of significance to the local shellfish industry.

Bays of Tasmania